Events in the year 1988 in Brazil.

Incumbents

Federal government
 President: José Sarney
 Vice President: vacant

Governors 
 Acre: Flaviano Melo
 Alagoas: Fernando Collor de Mello 
 Amazonas: Amazonino Mendes 
 Bahia: Waldir Pires 
 Ceará: Tasso Jereissati
 Espírito Santo: Max Freitas Mauro
 Goiás: Henrique Santillo
 Maranhão: Epitácio Cafeteira 
 Mato Grosso: Carlos Bezerra
 Mato Grosso do Sul: Marcelo Miranda Soares
 Minas Gerais: Newton Cardoso
 Pará: Hélio Gueiros 
 Paraíba: Tarcísio Burity
 Paraná: Alvaro Dias 
 Pernambuco: Miguel Arraes 
 Piauí: Alberto Silva
 Rio de Janeiro: Moreira Franco
 Rio Grande do Norte: Geraldo José Ferreira de Melo
 Rio Grande do Sul: Pedro Simon  
 Rondônia: Jerônimo Garcia de Santana 
 Roraima: Romero Jucá 
 Santa Catarina: Pedro Ivo Campos
 São Paulo: Orestes Quércia 
 Sergipe: Antônio Carlos Valadares

Vice governors
 Acre: Edison Simão Cadaxo
 Alagoas: Moacir Andrade
 Amazonas: Vivaldo Barros Frota
 Bahia: Nilo Moraes Coelho
 Ceará: Francisco Castelo de Castro
 Espírito Santo: Carlos Alberto Batista da Cunha
 Goiás: Joaquim Domingos Roriz
 Maranhão: João Alberto Souza 
 Mato Grosso: Edison Freitas de Oliveira
 Mato Grosso do Sul: George Takimoto
 Minas Gerais: Júnia Marise de Azeredo Coutinho
 Pará: Hermínio Calvinho Filho
 Paraíba: vacant
 Paraná: Ary Veloso Queiroz
 Pernambuco: Carlos Wilson Rocha de Queirós Campos
 Piauí: Lucídio Portela Nunes 
 Rio de Janeiro: Francisco Amaral
 Rio Grande do Norte: Garibaldi Alves 
 Rio Grande do Sul: Sinval Sebastião Duarte Guazzelli
 Rondônia: Orestes Muniz Filho
 Santa Catarina: Casildo João Maldaner
 São Paulo: Almino Afonso 
 Sergipe: Benedito de Figueiredo

Events

October 
 October 5: The country's current constitution is created. According to the new constitution, Roraima becomes Brazil's 24th state.

Births
March 28 - Arthur Sanches, football player
June 7 - Marlos, Brazilian-born Ukrainian international footballer
July 5 - Adriano Buzaid, racing driver
September 28 - Caio César, actor, voice actor and police officer (d. 2015)

Deaths 
January 4 – Henfil, cartoonist and writer (AIDS) (b. 1944)
April 25 – Lygia Clark, artist {heart attack) (b. 1920)
May 28 – Alfredo Volpi (b. 1896)
December 22 – Francisco Alves Mendes Filho, environmental activist (murdered) (b. 1944)
January 11 - Janires

See also 
1988 in Brazilian football
1988 in Brazilian television

References

 
1980s in Brazil
Years of the 20th century in Brazil
Brazil
Brazil